Nesterikha is a rural locality (a village) in Noginskoye Rural Settlement, Syamzhensky District, Vologda Oblast, Russia. The population was 6 as of 2002.

Geography 
Nesterikha is located 8 km west of Syamzha (the district's administrative centre) by road. Noginskaya is the nearest rural locality.

References 

Rural localities in Syamzhensky District